is a Japanese music composer and orchestrator who primarily does work in video games and anime. He has worked on titles such as Front Mission 3, Final Fantasy XII, the Shenmue series, Magic Knight Rayearth, and Hellsing Ultimate. Inspired by his mother, a piano teacher, he graduated from the music composition department of Tokyo University of the Arts. While in college, he composed for the band G-Clef, and occasionally stood in for members. Upon graduating in 1991, he went to work under Koichi Sugiyama, composer for the Dragon Quest series, where he arranged his tracks for the 1991 anime Dragon Quest: The Adventure of Dai.

Around the same time Matsuo began to compose original game music, his first being for Master of Monsters. Over the next few years, he worked on several games and anime series. In 1995, he joined the independent music composition group Imagine. He has continued since then to compose and orchestrate works for several game, anime, and television series, as well as a few pieces for original albums.

Biography

Early life
Matsuo's mother was a piano and electone teacher, and she inspired him to enjoy classical music. She also organized concerts for local children to compose and perform music in, which he took part in. While in school, he was inspired by Yellow Magic Orchestra and Rick Wakeman. He eventually attended Tokyo University of the Arts, where he focused on classical music. While in school, however, he also was involved in more popular music, and was involved with the progressive rock band G-Clef, filling in sometimes for members of the band, many of whom he was friends with. He also provided some music for the band. When he was near graduation, Matsuo was introduced to Koichi Sugiyama, the composer for the Dragon Quest franchise. Upon graduating, he went to work with Sugiyama.

Career
Matsuo began his career arranging Sugiyama's pieces for Dragon Quest: The Adventure of Dai in 1991. His first work as a  also came in 1991, with the video game Master of Monsters. His first notable work came in 1993 with Ogre Battle: March of the Black Queen, which he worked on with Hitoshi Sakimoto and Masaharu Iwata. Since then, he has worked on over 30 other video games, both as a composer and orchestrator.

Beginning in 1994, Matsuo has also written music for anime series. His first was Magic Knight Rayearth, which he considers to be a turning point in his career. In 2003 he composed the soundtrack for the live-action television show Kamen Rider 555, and in the early 1990s he arranged pieces for orchestration for the Orchestral Game Music Concerts. While his early work was done as an entirely freelance , in 1995 Matuso was recruited by Kohei Tanaka to join Imagine. Imagine is an independent music composition and sound effect group for video games, consisting of nine employees. While Matsuo has never released an album of original works himself, he has released numerous original tracks on six albums released on Shinji Hosoe's Troubadour Records label.

Works
All works listed below were composed by Matsuo unless otherwise noted.

Video games

Anime

Television works

References

External links
 Profile at IMAGINE inc. 
 Discography at VGMdb
 

1965 births
Anime composers
Japanese male composers
Japanese male pianists
Japanese music arrangers
Japanese television composers
Living people
Male television composers
Musicians from Chiba Prefecture
People from Kashiwa
Tokyo University of the Arts alumni
Video game composers